West Davidson High School, (also referenced as "WDHS", or simply as "West") is a public high school located in the Tyro, North Carolina community right outside of Lexington, North Carolina. West is accredited by the Southern Association of Colleges and Schools.

Administration
Principal – Heather Hoover 
Assistant principals - Joe Davis, Rhonda Gallimore

Feeder schools
Churchland Elementary 
Reeds Elementary 
Tyro Elementary 
Tyro Middle

Sports
West is a member of the Central Carolina 2A Conference. Their biggest rival is Central Davidson High School.
Football
Basketball
Baseball
Golf
Softball
Soccer
Tennis
Track and field
Cross Country
Swimming
Volleyball
Wrestling
Cheerleading

Sporting achievements
1986, NCHSAA 2A Women's Basketball State Champions
2010, NCHSAA 1A/2A Women's Swimming State Champions
2016, NCHSAA 1A/2A Women's Golf State Champions
2016, NCHSAA 2A Cheerleading State Champions
2018, NCHSAA 2A Volleyball State Runners-Up

Notable alumni
Josh Bush, former NFL free safety for the New York Jets, Denver Broncos, and Buffalo Bills. Was on the Denver Broncos Super Bowl 50 champion team.

References

1957 establishments in North Carolina
Educational institutions established in 1957
Public high schools in North Carolina
Schools in Davidson County, North Carolina